Robert Tralles Herres (December 1, 1932 – July 24, 2008) was a United States Air Force officer who served as the first vice chairman of the Joint Chiefs of Staff.

Early life and education
Herres was born on December 1, 1932, in Denver, where he attended East High School. He was active in the Boy Scouts of America and earned its highest rank, Eagle Scout. He graduated with a Bachelor of Science degree from the United States Naval Academy in 1954. He earned a Master of Science degrees in electrical engineering from the Air Force Institute of Technology and in Public Administration from George Washington University in 1960 and 1965, respectively. He completed Air Command and Staff College in 1965 and the Industrial College of the Armed Forces in 1971.

Military career
After graduating from the United States Naval Academy, Herres chose a commission in the United States Air Force because he saw a better chance at flying duty. After pilot training, Herres' early assignments were in fighter-interceptors, first as a pilot and then as an air electronics maintenance officer. Upon graduation from the Air Force Institute of Technology in 1960, he transferred to Europe, where he served as a technical intelligence analyst and, later, as a flying training supervisor.

Upon completion of Air Command and Staff College in 1965, Herres joined the Air University staff to instruct in weapons employment planning until entering training at the Aerospace Research Pilot School at Edwards Air Force Base, California, completing it in 1966.

In August 1967, Herres was assigned to the Manned Orbiting Laboratory program at the Space Systems Division of Air Force Systems Command in Los Angeles as an astronaut and chief of the Flight Crew Division. After program cancellation in 1969, he returned to the Flight Test Center at Edwards Air Force Base, where he served as deputy chief of staff for plans and requirements. He left Edwards in August 1970 to attend the Industrial College of the Armed Forces.

Herres became vice commander of the 449th Bombardment Wing at Kincheloe Air Force Base, Michigan, in June 1971 and commander the following year. In April 1973 he was assigned to Southeast Asia for duty as commander of the 310th Strategic Wing, U-Tapao Royal Thai Naval Airfield, Thailand. He returned to Kincheloe AFB in September 1973 to resume command of the 449th Bombardment Wing.

From March 1974 to June 1979, Herres served in various aspects of the command and control systems field at Headquarters Strategic Air Command, Electronic Systems Division of Air Force Systems Command and at the Headquarters of the United States Air Force at The Pentagon.

Herres became commander of Air Force Communications Command at Scott Air Force Base, Illinois in June 1979.  He later assumed command of SAC's 8th Air Force at Barksdale Air Force Base, Louisiana in July 1981, and became the director for command, control and communications systems for the Joint Chiefs of Staff in October 1982. He was assigned to Peterson Air Force Base, Colorado as commander in chief of the North American Aerospace Defense Command (NORAD) and Aerospace Defense Command, and commander of the Air Force Space Command in July 1984. He was promoted to full general on August 1, 1984, and became the first commander in chief of the United States Space Command upon activation of the unified command in September 1985.

Herres was selected as the first Vice Chairman of the Joint Chiefs of Staff in February 1987.

Dates of rank

Awards and decorations

Private sector career
Herres later served as chairman of USAA Group, a Fortune 200 company. He was USAA's chairman and CEO from 1993 to 2000 and continued as chairman until May 10, 2002.

During Herres' tenure as chief executive officer, USAA's Internet site was launched; the SSA senior bonus was instituted to reward the loyalty of long-term members; and a formalized way for employees to capture member feedback was created so that USAA could improve its services based on what the membership was saying.

Under his leadership, USAA enhanced its financial management discipline, project management discipline, and began its focus on a one company image.  General Herres left the company financially stronger, more efficient, and positioned for future growth.

Herres served as a member of the National Executive Board of the Boy Scouts of America and was awarded the Distinguished Eagle Scout and Silver Buffalo awards.

References

External links

Spacefacts biography of Robert T. Herres
USAA Remembers General Herres

1932 births
2008 deaths
George Washington University alumni
United States Naval Academy alumni
United States Air Force generals
Recipients of the Legion of Merit
Vice Chairmen of the Joint Chiefs of Staff
Joint Chiefs of Staff
American astronauts
Air Force Institute of Technology alumni
Neurological disease deaths in Texas
Deaths from cancer in Texas
Deaths from brain cancer in the United States
U.S. Air Force Test Pilot School alumni
Recipients of the Air Medal
Recipients of the Order of the Sword (United States)
Recipients of the Defense Distinguished Service Medal
Recipients of the Air Force Distinguished Service Medal